"Girls Night Out" is a single by English singer and songwriter Charli XCX. It was released on 26 July 2018 by Asylum Records and Atlantic Records UK as the third installment from a series of monthly single releases.

Release
Following numerous live performances, a demo of the song surfaced online in 2017, originally intended for Charli's scrapped third album. The track was later finalized and mastered for its official release, featuring additional vocal production and ad-libs during the bridge. On 25 July 2018, the song was officially confirmed as the next of Charli XCX's monthly singles, to be released later that week.

Critical reception
Althea Legaspi of Rolling Stone labeled the song as a "thumping, club-ready track". Henry Youtt of Billboard named the song a "peppy party anthem". Douglas Greenwood of NME thought of "Girls Night Out" as "the definitive antidote to everything bad in our lives. This song could reverse the effects of global warming. It could slash the cost of living in London to the price of a bottle of Lambrini. It's skin-cleansing; life-affirming – everything Charli XCX fans have ever wanted." In April 2022, Clash named the song among the 17 best of Charli's songs, with Gem Stokes comparing its melody and production with Madonna's "Holiday" and stating that "its complete unpretentious freedom" is what makes it so enjoyable.

Live performances
The song was premiered by Sophie at the Output club in Brooklyn, New York in July 2015. From 2015 to 2018 the song has been played at multiple live shows by both XCX and Sophie.

Track listing

Credits and personnel
Adapted from Tidal.

Charli XCX – vocals, lyrics
Sophie – production, lyrics, composition
Stargate – co-production, composition
Michael Freeman – mixing
Mark "Spike" Stent – mixing
Stuart Hawkes – mastering

References

2018 songs
2018 singles
Asylum Records singles
Atlantic Records singles
Warner Music Group singles
Charli XCX songs
Songs written by Charli XCX
Songs written by Sophie (musician)
Song recordings produced by Sophie (musician)
Song recordings produced by Stargate (record producers)